Santo Antônio do Jacinto (first part, Portuguese meaning "Saint Anthony") is a municipality in the northeastern part of the state of Minas Gerais, Brazil. The population is 11,604 (2020 est.) in an area of 503.38 km².

Neighboring municipalities

Jacinto
Rubim

Population history

See also
 List of municipalities in Minas Gerais

References

External links
 http://www.citybrazil.com.br/sp/stoantoniojacinto/ 

Municipalities in Minas Gerais